Nga Sơn is a district (huyện) of Thanh Hóa province in the North Central Coast region of Vietnam. The district capital is Nga Sơn. 

The district features many historical vestiges. These include Từ Thức grotto, Tien Pagoda (Chùa Tiên), and legends referring to Mai An Tiêm who, the story goes, was exiled to the then uninhabited islands, now known as Nga Son and Thanh Hoa.

Nga Sơn villagers were known for planting sedge -a grass-like plant with triangular stems, and weaving mats.

Demographics 
In 2018, the population of Nga Sơn was estimated to be about 155,200.

Geography 
The district is located northeast of the Thanh Hóa province. The district shares a border to the north and east with the Ninh Bình province, to the west with the Hà Trung district, and to the south with the Hậu Lộc district.

The district terrain consists mainly of plains and includes the Len River, which flows through the southern district of Nga Sơn.

Economy 
Nga Son hosts multiple district schools.

Climate

Things to Do 

 Phat Diem Cathedral

References

Districts of Thanh Hóa province